

References 

Post
S
Post-nominal letters